Cassiavellia is an extinct genus of saltwater clams, marine bivalve molluscs in the subclass Pteriomorphia. This genus existed in what is now Texas, during the upper Permian period. The type species is Cassiavellia galtarae, and the genus also contains the species C. nadkevnae.

References

Permian bivalves
Fossil taxa described in 2010
Bakevelliidae
Prehistoric bivalve genera